Barry X Ball (born 1955, Pasadena) is an American sculptor who lives and works in New York City.

His work has been widely exhibited internationally over the last 30 years and is represented in many public and private collections.

His work has been exhibited at the Ca’ Pesaro International Gallery of Modern Art, Powerhouse Museum / Museum of Applied Arts & Sciences, Frist Center for the Visual Arts, Museum of Arts and Design, Bass Museum of Art, Ca’ Rezzonico in conjunction with la Biennale di Venezia, PS 1 Contemporary Art Center, SITE Santa Fe, Ballroom Marfa, Galerie Nationale du Jeu de Paume, Magasin 3 Stockholm Konsthall, Le Printemps de Septembre, Domaine de Kerguéhennec, Kunsthalle Krems, Museo Cantonale d’Arte, me Collectors Room Berlin, Modemuseum Hasselt, Beijing Today Art Museum, Museo di arte moderna e contemporanea di Trento e Rovereto, Le Quartier, Centre d’art contemporain de Quimper, Musée d’art contemporain de Lyon, and at many international contemporary galleries and art fairs.

His work is in the collections of the Hammer Museum, San Francisco Museum of Modern Art, The Norton Museum of Art, The Maramotti Collection, Le Fonds régional d’art contemporain Bretagne, Magasin 3 Stockholm Konsthall, Museo Cantonale d’Arte, Museo di arte moderna e contemporanea di Trento e Rovereto, The Berlingieri Collection, The Olbricht Collection, and The Panza Collection.

Early life
Ball attended Pomona College, graduating in 1977.

Solo exhibitions
 1986: Craig Cornelius Gallery, New York City. March 15 - April 16
1988: Craig Cornelius Gallery, New York City. May 19 - June 18 
1990: , Brittany, France. Domaine de Kerguéhennec. (exh. cat.) Curated by Jean-Pierre Criqui. June 30 – September 2.
1991: Galerie Isy Brachot, Brussels. May 22 - June 29.  (exh. cat.)
1993: Magasin 3 Stockholm Konsthalle, Stockholm. March 18 - June 4.  (exh. cat.) 
1995: Luhring Augustine, New York City. Fall.
1997: Mario Diacono Gallery, Boston. April 19 - May 24 
1997: Luhring Augustine, New York City. January 11 - February 8 
2003-04: Mario Diacono Gallery, Boston. November 7, 2003 - January 3, 2004
 2004: MoMA PS1, New York City, 24 September – 17 October. (exh. cat.)
 2004: Printemps de Septembre at the Church of the Jacobins, Toulouse, France. In Extremis. Curated by Jean- Marc Bustamante and Pascal Pique.
2007: Galleria Michela Rizzo, Venice. June 6 - September 15.  (exh. cat.) 
2007: SITE Santa Fe, Santa Fe, New Mexico. One-Person Exhibition curated by Laura Heon. February 10 - May 13. (exh. cat.)
2008: De Pury & Luxembourg, Zurich. June 2 - August 16 
2009: Salon 94 Freemans, New York City. Masterpieces.  October 29 - December 12  
 2011: Ca' Rezzonico, Venice. Portraits and Masterpieces. 4 June – 6 November. (In conjunction with the 54th International Art Exhibition—la Biennale di Venezia.)
 2012: Galerie Nathalie Obadia, Gallery II, Paris. Barry X Ball: Matthew Barney / Barry X Ball Dual-Dual Portrait. 17 March – 16 May.
 2012: Museo Nazionale di Palazzo Mansi, Lucca, Italy. Barry X Ball: The Obsession with the Object (L’Ossessione dell’Oggetto). 17 October – 17 November.
2014-15: McCabe Fine Art, Stockholm, Sweden.  Masterpieces.  November 20 - December 20 and January 7 - 15, 2015. 
2015: 100 Tonson Gallery, Bangkok, Thailand.  Barry X Ball: Portraits and Photos.  January 15 - March 29 
2018: Castello Sforzesco / Museum of Ancient Art, Milan, Italy.  Barry X Ball: Pietà. April 12 - February 10 
2018-19: Villa Panza (FAI – Italian National Trust Space), Varese, Italy. A major retrospective of Barry’s works presenting 56 of his works produced since 1983. April 12 - February 10
2019: Venice, Italy.  Ca’ Pesaro International Museum of Modern Art.  Medardo Rosso Project. A collateral exhibition of the 2019 Venice Biennale of Art. May 8 – September 22 
2019: Mnuchin Gallery, New York City.   Barry X Ball.  Solo presentation of three recent sculptures. 1 November – 14 December  
2020: Nasher Sculpture Center, Dallas, Texas. A comprehensive solo exhibition of new and loaned works that will travel to other institutions. January 25 – April 19

Collections
Ball's work is held in the following public collections:
 Hammer Museum, California, USA
 San Francisco Museum of Modern Art, California, USA
 , France
 Magasin 3 Stockholm Konsthalle, Sweden
The Maramotti Collection, Italy
Museo Cantonale d’Arte, Lugano, Switzerland
 Museo di arte moderna e contemporanea di Trento e Rovereto, Italy
 Norton Museum of Art, Palm Beach, Florida, USA
The Berlingieri Collection, Italy
The Thomas Olbricht Collection, Germany
The Panza Collection, Italy/Switzerland

References

1955 births
Living people
People from Pasadena, California
Artists from California
Artists from New York City
Pomona College alumni